Sarah Woodhouse (born 1950 in Birmingham, England) is a British writer. In 1989, her novel The Peacock's Feather was awarded the Romantic Novel of the Year Award by the Romantic Novelists' Association.

Biography
Woodhouse was born in 1950 in Birmingham, England, UK. She grew up in Cambridgeshire and attended St Mary's convent school, before studying for a Bachelor of Arts in English Language and Literature at Reading University. In the mid 1970s, she moved to Norfolk and began to work on longer fiction, which culminated – in 1984 – with the publication of A Season of Mists, her first novel.

Woodhouse is the author of numerous short-stories, many of which were published in 19 magazine in the 1970s, and 9 novels, published between 1984 and 2000.

Bibliography

Ann of Norfolk Saga
 A Season of Mists (1984)
 The Peacock's Feather (1988)
 The Native Air (1990)

Single novels
 The Indian Widow (1985)
 Daughter of the Sea (1986)
 Enchanted Ground (1993)
 Meeting Lily (1994)
 Other Lives (1996)
 My Summer with Julia (2000)

References and sources

1950 births
People from Birmingham, West Midlands
Living people
English romantic fiction writers
Alumni of the University of Reading
RoNA Award winners
20th-century English novelists
20th-century English women writers
Women romantic fiction writers
English women novelists